Deqing may refer to the following locations in China:

 Deqing County, Guangdong (德庆县)
 Deqing County, Zhejiang (德清县)
 Dêqên Town, or Deqing (德庆), Tibet

Deqing may also refer to:

 the Ming Dynasty Buddhist monk Hanshan Deqing (憨山德清)

See also
Dêqên Tibetan Autonomous Prefecture, Yunnan
Dêqên County, Yunnan